Crotty v. An Taoiseach was a landmark 1987 decision of the Irish Supreme Court which found that Ireland could not ratify the Single European Act unless the Irish Constitution was first changed to permit its ratification. The case, taken by Raymond Crotty formally against the Taoiseach (then Garret FitzGerald), directly led to the Tenth Amendment of the Constitution of Ireland (which authorised the ratification of the Single Act) and established that significant changes to European Union treaties required an amendment to the Irish constitution before they could be ratified by Ireland. As a consequence, the Republic of Ireland, uniquely in the EU, requires a plebiscite for every new, or substantive change to a, European Union Treaty.

The substantive issues in the case revolved around the interpretation of Part III of the Single European Act which codified cooperation on foreign policy matters between the governments of the then twelve member states of the European Economic Community – referred to as European Political Cooperation – into an international agreement. The majority of the Court ruled that if the state ratified Part III, it would amount to an unconstitutional delegation of the state's external sovereignty. The dissenting judges argued that the provisions only constituted a requirement to listen and consult.

Supreme Court decision
The Supreme Court decision was split into two parts. The first dealt with the constitutionality of the European Communities (Amendment) Act 1986 and consequently the first two parts of the Single European Act. The Constitution requires that the Supreme Court only hand down a single judgement in such circumstances.

The second part of the Court's decision considered Raymond Crotty's challenge to the proposed ratification of Part III of the Single European Act. As this did not involve a challenge to the constitutionality of legislation, each judge is free to hand down separate judgements. In a 3-2 decision a majority of the Court found Part III to be repugnant to the Constitution.

European Communities (Amendment) Act 1986
The judgement of the Court on the constitutionality of the 1986 Act was given of Finlay CJ. The Court first considered where the 1986 Act could take advantage of the Third Amendment which granted constitutional immunity to legal measures which were necessitated by membership of the European Communities.

The Court then continued:

The plaintiff made four arguments challenging the constitutionality of the 1986 Act. These were:
 
 that the Act unlawfully surrendered Irish sovereignty by changing the decision making process within the Council of Ministers from unanimity to a qualified majority in six policy areas,
 that the potential creation of a European Court of First Instance would be an unlawful delegation of the judicial power of the state,
 that by the addition of four new policy objectives to the Treaty of Rome fell outside the authorisation provided in the Third Amendment, and
 that powers granted to the Council of Ministers in the area of provision of services and concerning the working environment, health and safety of workers were outside the original Constitutional authorisation and could encroach upon rights guaranteed by the Constitution.

The Court rejected all of these arguments. They noted that the Treaty of Rome provided for moving from unanimous voting to qualified majority and concluded that:

The Court ruled further that the "new" policy areas fell within the original objectives of the Treaty of Rome, that the creation of a new court would not increase the judicial power already delegated to the European institutions, and that the Plaintiff had failed to show how the new powers to be granted to the Council of Ministers could threaten constitutional rights.

Part III of the Single European Act
Walsh and Henchy JJ. gave separate judgements with which Hederman J. concurred. They ruled that were Ireland to ratify Part III it would amount to unconstitutional delegation of the state's external sovereignty. They rejected the argument that the constitutionality of a treaty could only be questioned when it was incorporated into law by a statute and ruled that the courts had the power to interfere in the government's exercise of foreign affairs in the case of there being a "clear disregard by the government of the powers and duties conferred on it by the Constitution." 

The Court's dissenting members argued that the courts had no jurisdiction to question the constitutionality of a treaty which had not been incorporated into the law of the state. While they agreed with the majority that the courts could interfere with the government's exercise of the state's foreign affairs in the case of a clear disregard of the Constitution, they did not agree that the government had shown any such disregard.

Walsh J.

Henchy J.

Hederman J

Finlay CJ

Griffin J

Further reading
 Bradley, Kieran St C., "The referendum on the Single European Act" (1987) European Law Review 301
 Hogan, G. W., "The Supreme Court and the Single European Act" (1987) 22(1) Irish Jurist 55
 Temple Lang, John, "The Irish Court Case which delayed the Single European Act: Crotty v. An Taoiseach and Others" (1987) 24 Common Market Law Review 709

References

External links

1987 in case law
1987 in Irish law
1987 in the Republic of Ireland
Ireland and the European Union
Republic of Ireland constitutional case law